The South Sydney District Junior Rugby Football League is an affiliation of junior clubs in the inner southern and south-eastern suburbs.

History

When the South Sydney Rabbitohs first entered the NSWRL competition as South Sydney in 1908, Souths would become neighbours to fellow city counterpart, the Eastern Suburbs Roosters. Anzac Parade separated the territories for both inner-Sydney clubs when the boundaries were first established the previous year. Souths' boundaries were based on the municipalities of Redfern, Botany, Alexandria, Mascot and Waterloo, while the Roosters' boundaries were those of the eastern municipalities of Paddington, Woollahra, Vaucluse and Waverley.

The new junior league boundaries set out in the early 1950s would take territory away from the Roosters, and hand it over to rival neighbouring club South Sydney.

In the mid-20th century, the southern half of Roosters territory within the Randwick local government area was handed to South Sydney.  The NSWRL made this change to 'even the competition' as South Sydney's original heartland, around Redfern and Waterloo, had rapidly industrialised and de-populated.  Rabbitohs stalwart S.G. Ball was a dual administrator within South Sydney Rabbitohs and the New South Wales Rugby League at the time. The Rabbitohs were in a highly successful period and had established South Sydney Juniors Rugby League Club in Kingsford, Roosters territory in recent times.

Debate still continues amongst rival fans as to how and why Eastern Suburbs territory, comprising suburbs with junior league clubs rich in talent and numbers in the Randwick and Coogee areas, was given to South Sydney.  The Roosters expressed disappointment at losing some of its junior clubs, but the NSWRL would not waver.

This was not to be the end of struggle for junior territory between the two inner-city clubs. In the 1980s some junior clubs such as Paddington Colts that were within Roosters territory became dissatisfied with Roosters management and affiliated with South Sydney.

After the Newtown Jets were expelled from the NSWRL in 1983, their junior district was eventually absorbed into the South Sydney junior district in 1987.  With the tide having turned compared to the situation decades earlier, and the Roosters having a much smaller junior League than South Sydney, Eastern Suburbs at this time then made unsuccessful attempts to regain the suburbs on the same grounds used to hand the southern parts of Coogee and Randwick from Easts to Souths, that of providing an 'even competition'.  The NSWRL, controlled at the time by a Board with a ruling faction of representatives from South Sydney (Terry Parker), Balmain (Keith Barnes), Canterbury (Peter Moore) and Manly (Ken Arthurson), refused to redraw the boundaries.

Current District Clubs

 Asterisks indicates years where premierships were shared between two teams.

2022 A Grade Divisions

A Grade Premierships

Reference:

A Reserve Premierships

Team of the Century
On 16 May 2008, the South Sydney Juniors Team of the Century was named at the Centenary Ball.

 Eric Simms (La Perouse United)
 Harold Holder (Kinkora Juniors)
 Paul Sait (Matraville Tigers)
 Ray Branighan (Moore Park)
 Benny Wearing (Redfern Ioanas)
 Greg Hawick (Alexandria Rovers)
 Clem Kennedy (Cleveland Street)
 Brian Hambly (Mascot Jets)
 George Piggins (Mascot Jets)
 Ian Roberts (Mascot Jets)
 Bob McCarthy (Moore Park)
 George Treweek (Mascot Jets)
 Ron Coote (c) (Kensington United)
 
 Terry Hill (Zetland Magpies)
 Craig Wing (Maroubra Lions)
 Craig Coleman (Waterloo Waratahs)
 Gary Stevens (Chelsea United)

Coach: Alf Blair (Waterloo Albions)

See also

 Balmain District Junior Rugby League
 Cronulla-Sutherland District Rugby Football League
 Manly-Warringah/North Sydney District Rugby League
 Parramatta Junior Rugby League
 Penrith District Rugby League
 Sydney Roosters Juniors
 Rugby League Competitions in Australia

References

External links
 
 

1947 establishments in Australia
Sports leagues established in 1947
South Sydney Rabbitohs
Junior rugby league
Rugby league competitions in New South Wales
Rugby league in Sydney